Gitura is a settlement in Kenya's Central Province.

References 

 Airports in Gitura and in the neighbourhood
 Neghelli (Mil) Airport (distanced approximately 750 km) 
 Baco/bako Airport (distanced approximately 750 km) 
 Arba Minch Airport (distanced approximately 780 km) 
 Bambu Airport (distanced approximately 780 km) 
 Bulchi Airport (distanced approximately 790 km) 

Populated places in Central Province (Kenya)